Kolangal (: "Silhouettes") is a 1981 Indian Malayalam film, directed by K. G. George and produced by D. Philip and K. T. Varghese. The film stars Thilakan, Nedumudi Venu, Venu Nagavally and Sreenivasan in the lead roles. The film is based on the story "Oru Gramathinte Athmavu" by P. J. Antony and depicts life, constraints, and frustrations of people in a central-Travancore fictional village.

Plot
Mariamma and Aliamma are neighbours and enemies. Aliamma's daughter is taken to Madras by their relative under false pretenses of getting her a good job but she returns home impregnated.

Mariamma's daughter Kunjamma falls in love with a new bangle seller, Cheriyan. But Mariamma refuses their relationship. A parasitic villager, Chacko spreads rumors about Kunjamma losing her chastity for making her unappealing with potential suitors, and for Kallu Varky.

Paramu is a character who considers women of the village as his property, he sees them through vulgar eyes, he is village's peeping tom, and if women refuses his advances he intimidates them and spreads rumors about them for destroying their lives.

Raman Nair is another character of the film that helps the villagers when they need money, when they need land to dwell, and acts as a mediator in their problems. He supports the village in his own ways. However, even his intervention for Cheriyan's and Kunjamma's marriage didn't see success.

In the end when Mariyamma's husband dies and she is vulnerable, Chacko comes with Kallu Varky's proposal for marrying Kunjamma and donning the saviours role. Mariyamma believing  Chacko's good intentions marries her off to Kallu Varky. Cheriyan who was planning to settle in the village, leaves the village after burning down his hut.

Cast

Thilakan as Kallu Varkky
Nedumudi Venu as Paramu
Venu Nagavally as Cheriyan
Sreenivasan as Keshavan
Menaka as Kunjamma
Rajam K. Nair as Chanda Mariya
Gladis as Eliyama
Sumangali as Leela
 P. A. Aziz as Kutty Shankaran Nair
Jagadeesh as Ittupu/Susheel Kumar
George Cheriyan
D. Philip
Annavi Rajan
Kumudam
Noohu
P. A. Latheef
Rajakumari Venu
Sarojam
T. M. Abraham

Music

There are two famous limericks in the film starting "Kaallae nee parishudhan aakunnu" and "Ithino adame ninne njan thottathil aaki" made (using existent Christian folk songs) and sung by Thilakan.

Awards
Rajam K. Nair won the award for second best actress at the annual Kerala State Film Awards.

References

External links
 

1981 films
1980s Malayalam-language films
Films shot in Kollam
Films based on short fiction
Films directed by K. G. George